This table displays the top-rated primetime television series of the 2013–14 season as measured by Nielsen Media Research.

References

2013 in American television
2014 in American television
2013-related lists
2014-related lists
Lists of American television series